Daniel Vincent Frisella (March 4, 1946 – January 1, 1977) was a Major League Baseball pitcher whose career was cut short when he was killed in a dune buggy accident on New Year's Day

Early years

Frisella spent one year at the College of San Mateo before transferring to Washington State University in Pullman. After leading the Cougars to the College World Series in 1965 and being named to the All-Conference team, he was selected by the Milwaukee Braves in the 39th round of the 1965 Major League Baseball Draft, but did not sign. In , he was again named All-Conference, and led WSU to the District VIII Regional finals. After which, he was drafted by the New York Mets in the third round of the June  Secondary draft, and signed.

Minor league career
He began the  season in the Carolina League with the Durham Bulls, where he went 9-3 with a 1.49 ERA in thirteen starts to earn a promotion all the way up to triple A. He began seeing more work as a relief pitcher with the Jacksonville Suns, and was added to the major league bullpen by the end of July.

After three  relief appearances (8 innings pitched, no earned runs) for manager Wes Westrum, Frisella was added to the Mets' starting rotation.  He was 1-6 in his eleven starts with a 3.82 ERA. His one win came against the Pittsburgh Pirates on August 11. In a no-decision against the San Francisco Giants. Frisella allowed just two hits over nine innings while striking out seven.

Frisella spent the next two seasons shuffling from the minor leagues to the majors, compiling a 2-4 record and 4.28 ERA in 22 games at the major league level, and 15-4 record and 2.65 ERA in the minors.

Major league career

New York Mets
Following the  season, Frisella played winter ball in Venezuela. Venezuelan Baseball Hall of Famer Diego Segui, who was a forkball specialist, taught Frisella the pitch. It turned out to be Frisella's out pitch for the rest of his career, as it had such impressive movement on it that he was often accused of throwing a spitter.

After starting the  season in Triple A, Frisella joined the Mets in the beginning of July. He earned his first career save in his first appearance of the season, and his record stood at 4-0 with a 1.88 ERA at the end of the month. He ended the season with an 8-3 record, 3.02 ERA and 54 strikeouts in 65.2 innings pitched. Opposing batters batted just .204 against him. Despite missing half the season, his 29 relief appearances were third most on the team.

In , Frisella and Tug McGraw formed a devastating righty/lefty tandem closing out Mets games. Following three innings of scoreless ball pitched on the 4th of July, Frisella saw his ERA hit a season low of 1.37. He ended the season at 8-5 with a 1.99 ERA and a team leading twelve saves. After going 5–8 with a 3.34 ERA and nine saves, Frisella was traded along with Gary Gentry from the Mets to the Atlanta Braves for Félix Millán and George Stone on November 1, .

Atlanta Braves
Frisella developed arm trouble during spring training , and dealt with nagging health issues throughout the season. While he led the team with eight saves, Frisella had nine blown saves. The second of these came against his former club in his first game back at Shea Stadium. Entering the game in the eighth inning with the Braves leading 2-1, Frisella allowed both inherited base runners to score, and gave up an additional four earned runs of his own, while retiring just two batters.

After logging five saves through June, poor performance and injury limited him to just one over the remainder of the season. His last game as a Brave was also his only start for the team. Against the Mets at Shea, he went four innings, and gave up four earned runs in a no-decision. At the winter meetings after the season, the Braves sent Frisella to the San Diego Padres to reacquire Cito Gaston.

San Diego Padres
Frisella enjoyed something of a resurgence in San Diego. Despite a 1-6 record, he pitched a career high 97.2 innings in a career high 65 appearances to go along with a 3.13 ERA. He and Bill Greif, both right handers, shared closing duties, with each recording nine saves. During spring training , Frisella was dealt to the St. Louis Cardinals for lefty pitcher Ken Reynolds and minor leaguer Bob Stewart.

Cardinals & Brewers
With Al Hrabosky already in their bullpen, the Cards had no need for a closer. Thus, Frisella became more of a right handed specialist for the Cardinals. He did well in that role, holding opposing batters to a .190 batting average, and compiling a 1.45 ERA. Two poor performances against Cincinnati's "Big Red Machine" saw his ERA balloon to 3.97 before he was sent to the Milwaukee Brewers for a player to be named later midway through the season.

In his half season with the Brewers, he became manager Alex Grammas' favorite right hander out of the bullpen. He pitched 3.1 innings of one-hit ball against the California Angels to earn his first save with his new team, on his way to a team leading nine. He went 5-2 with a 2.74 ERA while holding batters to a .175 batting average.

MLB career statistics

Personal life
Frisella died on January 1, 1977, the result of a dune buggy accident. His friend, who was driving the dune buggy, escaped with only minor injuries. Frisella tried to jump from the vehicle as it began to flip, but he was unable to free his leg from the dune buggy and his head was struck by the roll bar.

Frisella was survived by his wife, Pamela, and two sons. Pamela was pregnant with the couple's second son at the time of Frisella's death; he was born on March 4, on what would have been Frisella's 31st birthday. 

Frisella served with the Air National Guard during his minor league career.

See also
 List of baseball players who died during their careers

References

External links
, or Baseball Almanac, or Baseball Gauge, or Estadisticas Beisbol profesional Venezolano (Venezuelan Professional Baseball League), or Ultimate Mets Database
SABR BioProject

1946 births
1977 deaths
Accidental deaths in Arizona
Atlanta Braves players
Auburn Mets players
Baseball players from California
Durham Bulls players
Florida Instructional League Mets players
Jacksonville Suns players
Leones del Caracas players
American expatriate baseball players in Venezuela
Major League Baseball pitchers
Milwaukee Brewers players
New York Mets players
Pompano Beach Mets players
Road incident deaths in Arizona
St. Louis Cardinals players
San Diego Padres players
Tidewater Tides players
Washington State Cougars baseball players
Washington State University alumni
Junípero Serra High School (San Mateo, California) alumni
Alaska Goldpanners of Fairbanks players